Tushar Deshpande (born 15 May 1995) is an Indian cricketer. He made his first-class debut for Mumbai in the 2016–17 Ranji Trophy on 6 October 2016. He made his List A debut for Mumbai in the 2018–19 Vijay Hazare Trophy on 19 September 2018. He took his first five-wicket haul in List A cricket in the quarter-finals of the tournament on 14 October 2018. The following month, he was named as one of eight players to watch ahead of the 2018–19 Ranji Trophy.

In August 2019, he was named in the India Blue team's squad for the 2019–20 Duleep Trophy. In the 2020 IPL auction, he was bought by the Delhi Capitals ahead of the 2020 Indian Premier League. In February 2022, he was bought by the Chennai Super Kings in the auction for the 2022 Indian Premier League tournament.

References

External links
 

1995 births
Living people
Indian cricketers
Mumbai cricketers
Cricketers from Mumbai
Chennai Super Kings cricketers
Delhi Capitals cricketers